Olaus Matthiae Lappo-Sirma (Ca. 1655, probably in Soađegilli - 1719 in Eanodat, Finnish Lapland, Sápmi), was a Sámi priest and the first Sámi poet known by name to posteriority. His most well-known work is the poem Moarsi favrrot, which Henry Wadsworth Longfellow alluded to in his poem  "My Lost Youth".

Education and priesthood
Olaus Sirma went to school in Duortnus, and later attended University of Uppsala further south in Sweden. Sirma was one of the few Sámi students at Uppsala who did not come from the Sámi schools of Liksjoe or Biŧon. Following his education, Sirma served as a priest from 1675 until his death in Eanodat. Olaus Sirma translated the catechism of Johannes Gezelius to his native Kemi Sámi, a now extinct Sámi language. He applied to have it printed in 1688 and in 1716, but did not receive funds. The book was printed only in 1913.

Poetry
In addition to his ecclesiastical work, Sirma served as a source for Johannes Schefferus when the latter wrote his book Lapponia (1673). Among Sirmas many contributions were the lyrics to two joiks. These two joiks, which were love poems, were translated to Latin in Lapponia, and later spread as Schefferus' book was translated into other languages. A line from one of these joiks, Moarsi favrrot ("My beautiful girlfriend"), also known as Oarrejávri ("Squirrel Lake"), was alluded to and quoted by Longfellow in his poem "My Lost youth" (1855).

In the following is the original, a translation to English, and Longfellow's poem, with the quoted passage in italics.

See also
 Kemi Sámi language. The article reproduces Sirma's two joik lyrics in full.
 Lapponia, the book by Johannes Schefferus.
 Sámi school (Sweden) for more information about the school system where Sirma got his education. 
 Henry Wadsworth Longfellow

Notes

References
 

1650s births
1719 deaths
Year of birth uncertain
Sámi-language poets
17th-century Swedish Lutheran priests
18th-century Swedish Lutheran priests
Finnish priests
Uppsala University alumni